60th parallel may refer to:

60th parallel north, a circle of latitude in the Northern Hemisphere
60th parallel south, a circle of latitude in the Southern Hemisphere